Teardown is a 2022 sandbox, puzzle and action game developed and published by Tuxedo Labs. The game revolves around the owner of a financially stricken demolition company, who is caught executing a questionable job and becomes entangled between helping police investigations and taking on further dubious assignments. Teardown features levels made of destructible voxels, and the player follows the campaign through subsequent missions. In most missions, the player must collect or destroy objects connected to a security alarm. The player has unlimited time to prepare and is given upgradable tools, vehicles, and explosives to create a path within the level that allows them to complete the objectives as quickly as possible. A timer starts as soon as the security alarm is triggered, and the player must complete all required objectives and reach a getaway vehicle within sixty seconds.

Teardown uses a proprietary game engine developed by Dennis Gustafsson. He began developing the technology after winding down his previous company, Mediocre, in 2017. He initially implemented destructible voxels with ray tracing and teamed up with former Mediocre designer Emil Bengtsson to find amicable gameplay concepts that used this technology. Gustafsson conceived the two-phase heist concept, which he and Bengtsson refined. Gustafsson regularly shared development updates via Twitter and the resulting popularity led him to not pursue traditional marketing for Teardown. The game was announced in October 2019 and made available as an early access game in October 2020 with one half of the campaign, the other being added in December 2021. The completed game was released in April 2022.

Teardown saw positive reactions leading up to and during its early access phase, and it received favourable reviews upon release. Critics praised the game's physics, interactivity, graphics implementation, art style, and music. Mixed opinions were raised regarding the campaign progression and story and some control elements were criticised. The game's support for mods was cited as a major factor for its longevity. Teardown sold 1.1 million copies by August 2022, and the game's success led to Tuxedo Labs being acquired by Saber Interactive.

Gameplay 

Teardown is a sandbox game with puzzle and action elements. The player can freely navigate the game's nine levels, which consist entirely of destructible voxels. Some voxel materials require stronger tools to destroy. The player starts out with a sledgehammer, fire extinguisher, and spraycan. The spraycan can be used to mark points of interest. Later tools are unlocked throughout the campaign, including a blowtorch, a shotgun, bombs, and a rocket launcher, which have limited uses. New structures can be erected using planks. Acquired tools can be upgraded using cash earned from collecting valuables scattered throughout levels. Vehicles including trucks, cranes, excavators, and boats can be used for traversal and destruction, as well as explosives like propane tanks.

Each mission comprises one or more objectives, of which some are required and some optional. In most missions, the player is tasked with stealing or destroying a predetermined set of objects connected to a security alarm. Once it is triggered, the player has sixty seconds to complete the required objectives and reach a getaway vehicle. Failing to do so results in a security helicopter spotting the getaway vehicle and the player failing the level. The initial setup time is unlimited to allow the player to plan and create a fast route between the objectives. Level overviews and route replays are presented from a top-down view. In other kinds of missions, the player must raze buildings to an indicated height, move heavy objects to a central location, avoid an attack helicopter, pass by security robots undetected, or extinguish fires from lightning strikes to avoid triggering a fire alarm. Some levels feature multiple missions with slightly altered world designs. All missions are accessible via a hub world, and previous progress can be loaded from a quick save.

Through accessibility options, the player can adjust the game's difficulty, such as by increasing the time they have to complete a level after triggering the timer. Outside of the campaign, the Sandbox mode puts the player into any of the unlocked levels with all tools and their upgrades but without objectives. Three challenge modes can be played on each unlocked level: In Mayhem, the player must destroy as many voxels as possible within sixty seconds; in Hunted, the player is tasked with collecting randomly appearing items while being chased by an attack helicopter; and in Fetch, the player has to collect as many items as possible in a sixty-second time frame.

Modding 
Custom levels and structures can be modelled using the program MagicaVoxel and imported into the game. Teardown includes a level editor and integration with the Steam Workshop. Most game elements are scriptable using the Lua programming language. Early on, players created art using the in-game tools, while mods had appeared by November 2020. More than 1,100 mods had been submitted to the Steam Workshop by May 2022. The game highlights select mods curated by the developers. The Art Vandals expansion, released in December 2022, was modelled as a mod to showcase the modding system's capabilities.

Plot 
Teardowns story is primarily told through emails that the player character receives. The game takes place in the fictional Löckelle Municipality and the player controls the unnamed owner of Löckelle Teardown Services. The company is facing financial hardships due to a lack of clients, so the owner accepts a dubious job from Gordon Woo, who requests that an old building be destroyed during the night to make way for his Evertides Mall. On the day after the demolition, the owner's mother, Tracy, alerts them that the razed building had been under cultural heritage protection and that a traffic camera had caught the company vehicle entering the site. Löckelle Police Department criminal investigator Parisa Terdiman agrees not to pursue an investigation if the owner helps her investigate Lawrence Lee Junior and his company, Lee Chemicals. Under her orders, the owner repeatedly breaks into the Lee Chemicals premises and Lee's private properties to retrieve information about a mystery client.

While Lee and Woo repeatedly request destruction jobs aimed at the other, Terdiman discovers that Lee Chemicals' client is BlueTide, an energy drink producer run by Mr Amanatides. As no official records exist on Amanatides, Terdiman asks the owner to retrieve communication data from BlueTide's premises on Hollowrock Island and accounting data from Lee Chemicals. Through Woo, Amanatides learns of the owner's services and hires them to increase BlueTide's security by obtaining confidential information on autonomous guard robots. In the meantime, Tracy purchases a new company vehicle and retains the old one for herself. As Terdiman investigates an unknown substance found in BlueTide's drinks, a leftover shipping label recovered from Hollowrock Island reveals that Amanatides controls the Evertides Mall and uses it as a repackaging hub for the substance. Shipping logs from the Evertides Mall leads the owner to the Muratori Islands, where Terdiman orders them to secure evidence and destroy the local supply chain.

As a result of the disruptions on Hollowrock Island, at the Evertides Mall, and on the Muratori Islands, Amanatides fires Woo as the mall's manager and begins a revenge plot against who he believes harmed BlueTide's business. He orders the owner to retrieve a truck, autonomous robots, and nitroglycerin. Amanatides uses these components to assemble a destructive machine he dubs the Truxterminator. Terdiman and the Löckelle Police Department raid Hollowrock Island and apprehend Amanatides, who reveals that he had already deployed the Truxterminator to destroy the town of Cullington, where he had spotted the former Löckelle Teardown Services company vehicle in Tracy's driveway. Tracy is unaware of her fate as she is trying out her new tanning bed, so the owner arrives in Cullington and safely guides the Truxterminator through the town and into the sea.

Development and release

Technology and prototypes 
Teardown was developed by Tuxedo Labs, an indie game studio founded by Swedish programmer Dennis Gustafsson. Gustafsson had previously been involved with companies developing middleware for game physics. Together with Henrik Johansson, he had founded the mobile game studio Mediocre in 2010, where they worked on Smash Hit, PinOut, and the Sprinkle series. After shutting down Mediocre in 2017, Gustafsson began working on technology for destructible environments using voxels, an idea he had been looking to pursue for some time. Voxels appeared easier to implement because regular polygons would have led to arbitrary geometry with overly complex collision detection. Inspired by MagicaVoxel, he implemented the voxel technology alongside real-time ray tracing, which the simplicity of voxel-based scenes made possible. Reflection colours use screen space reflection instead of full-path tracing "for performance reasons". Smoke is simulated using a fluid animation system Gustafsson had authored for Sprinkle and is rendered with stochastic transparency. Unlike traditional voxel engines that manage all voxels in a single volume, Gustafsson chose to use several volumes that contain a smaller number of voxels to allow for local translation. The resulting game engine and custom tools were written in C++. In the engine, voxels were implemented using an 8-bit colour palette, where each material determines a voxel's colour, roughness, emissiveness, reflectivity, and physical material type. Gustafsson did not add material stress to the engine, feeling as though predictable behaviour would be more beneficial to the player.

After creating a voxel sandbox, he worked alongside former Mediocre designer Emil Bengtsson to come up with gameplay concepts. Like with Smash Hit and Sprinkle, Gustafsson wanted to model the gameplay around the technology, this time using destruction as a key element. He described this process as difficult "because any traditional game objective could just be solved by the player creating a straight line from A to B", with walls and doors unable to restrict the player. Several ideas were floated, starting with a driving game in which the player would drive into and topple objects. They decided against this concept because the destruction was merely an effect rather than central to the gameplay. Several stealth game prototypes followed over the span of several months, but Gustafsson and Bengtsson were unable to construct stealth gameplay where the enemies were insensitive to the sound of the player's destruction. The developers explored a survival game prototype featuring giant spiders, but Gustafsson and Bengtsson were generally not content with the use of enemies, as they would disrupt the destructive gameplay. Lastly, they toyed with a heist concept, requiring the player to steal a predefined set of objects. Gustafsson and Bengtson considered this task too trivial but regarded using limited tools and caches as too restrictive. Seven months into the development, after the two could not come to a mutually liked gameplay variant, Bengtsson left the project in early 2019. Gustafsson further experimented with the technology on his own, refusing to drop the work he had already done. He stated that it was difficult to find a justification for the possible destruction in the game without resorting to a shooter game or violent gameplay in general. He considered the design process his most frustrating yet.

Game design and implementation 
Gustafsson shared the progress of his technology on Twitter from 2018 onwards. By August 2019, he had developed a game concept that he planned to release. Gustafsson came up with the two-phase heist structure with unlimited setup time and limited execution time. He said that it was "compatible with all the limitations (or lack thereof)" of a fully destructible environment while "offering an interesting challenge". As a result of the destructibility, obstacles within levels could only be designed with elevation, distance, water, and unbreakable objects. Additionally, Gustafsson intended to use few unbreakable parts, mostly for levels' lower bounds. He avoided overly large maps, initially due to a technical restriction, and later to keep navigation from becoming tedious. Within the second phase of the structure, Gustafsson settled on a simple timer, rather than other concepts such as a slowly flooding cavern. The initial levels Gustafsson designed for this concept were long, straight corridors that the player would have travelled twice, reaching an item and returning to the getaway vehicle. After Bengtsson re-joined the project, the two discovered that the game played much better when it featured multiple objectives in a non-linear open world, which became the final design.

Levels were designed with MagicaVoxel. For the quick save system, Gustafsson used run-length encoding to compress world data at high speeds, seeking to encourage the system's use by eliminating long load times. A popular request from fans was to have the security helicopter not spot the getaway vehicle when the timer runs out and instead chase after the player. Gustafsson disliked this idea, saying that it "would introduce an element of randomness that would discourage the strategic thinking and careful planning". He once looked into procedurally altering levels to reflect damage the player had inflicted earlier but scrapped the idea due to time. Adding multiplayer was not planned as the engine was written for single-player gameplay, and the team considered the networked synchronisation of all voxel physics technically infeasible. Anticipating that players would want to mod the game, he moved much of the game's gameplay logic from C++ to Lua. Gustafsson cited as the ultimate goal that modders should be able to create entirely new gameplay mechanics within the game's framework.

Music and sound design 
Douglas Holmquist, who had worked on many of Mediocre's games, created Teardowns music and sound design, starting part-time November 2019 before joining full-time in February 2020. He recorded impact, break, and squeak sounds for the in-game materials, weapon sounds (using a Benelli M4 and Colt M1911), vehicle sounds, and ambience. He worked on Foley with sound engineer Mathias Schlegel. During the development, unused sounds Holmquist had created for Smash Hit were used as placeholders. He composed and performed the game's soundtrack with Andreas Baw on the drums, Hans Kristian Durán providing vocals for the song "Löckelle", and Håkan Åkesson mastering the songs at Nutid Studio.

Early access and release 
Gustafsson revealed the game as Teardown on 1 October 2019. The announcement was coupled with the release of a walkthrough video, a website, and a preparatory Steam storefront page. Later development updates shared by Gustafsson documented dynamic weather, further vehicles and levels, and other content being added. The game's online presence grew its pre-release popularity substantially and he thus chose to not use any traditional marketing techniques. Gustafsson formally founded Tuxedo Labs in Malmö in 2019. Another trailer showcased Teardown during Gamescom: Opening Night Live in August 2020. Gustafsson planned to release the game as a Steam Early Access title for Windows later in 2020. He made it available as such via Steam on 29 October 2020. By this time, the development team comprised Gustafsson, Bengtsson, and five contractors. They later brought on John Kearney as Teardowns art director. The early access phase was to last approximately one year, subject to change depending on player feedback, to allow for the addition of more content. The initial release included one half of the game, Part 1, with the second in development by January 2021. Part 2, released on 2 December 2021, added further missions and tools, as well as enemy robots. The completed game was released on 21 April 2022. The trailer announcing this release date, published earlier that month, compiled the updates made during the early access phase.

Reception

Pre-release 
During its early access phase, Teardown was received well. Graham Smith of Rock Paper Shotgun lauded the game's voxel destruction mechanics and their intrinsic value to the gameplay, considering the destruction technology to outperform foregone destruction-focused games like Red Faction: Guerrilla. GameStars Christian Just praised the game's sandbox approach to level destruction and the technology's level of detail. Rick Lane of Bit-Tech called the game's puzzles "highly open ended yet beautifully challenging". Smith regarded the game as rarely frustrating due to its use of quick saves, which Andy Kelly of PC Gamer echoed. Smith also described the successful completion of a level within 60 seconds, after having spent up to an hour planning the route, as rewarding. Likewise, Nathan Grayson of Kotaku stated that it felt "amazing" to complete a level with little time left. Connor Sheridan of GamesRadar+ regarded the game's music as "slick". Lane noted that the visual style was "splendid". Eurogamers Robert Purchese was amazed by the unexpected existence of a story. PC Gamers Natalie Clayton praised Teardowns ray-traced lighting implementation and overall art style as "something utterly gorgeous". She believed that its mod support had transformed it "from a fun curiosity into a worthy successor to the king of physics sandboxes, Garry's Mod and gave it longevity.

With only Part 1 released at the time, Just felt that the game lacked varying content, making it feel "lifeless and dull" after an initial "wow effect". He called the game's worlds "oddly cold and empty" and further cited a perceived lack of optimisation. Smith criticised some imprecise interactions between the game's elements, such as the player colliding with "glitchy" object edges or large, partially destroyed structures being supported by very few voxels due to a lack of stress.

Release 

Teardown received "generally favorable reviews", according to the review aggregator website Metacritic, which calculated a weighted average rating of 80/100 based on nineteen critic reviews. Clayton, who reviewed the game for PC Gamer, labelled the game "the most creative sandbox platform since Garry's Mod and an "endlessly delightful destruction sandbox". Stefania Netti of Eurogamer.it similarly called it "the interactive fulcrum par excellence, that twisted gratification that never tires". Dawid Biel of CD-Action described interactions with fires, explosions, and destruction of large structures as "mesmerising". Teardowns physics were praised as "superb" by GameSpots Alessandro Barbosa, who felt that "the chaotic nature of its physics are a consistent source of joy". Game Rants Dwayne Jenkins regarded the game a "technical marvel" with "a startling amount of detail" in its physics. However, Netti and Annika Menzel of PC Games lamented that buildings could remain unrealistically supported by very few blocks. Benjamin Schmädig of Eurogamer.de cited this as a stark contrast to the ease with which some materials could be destroyed. John Cantees of GamingBolt found the interactions with some objects "finicky" and lamented "floaty" controls while jumping, while Jenkins faulted poor controls for vehicles.

Cantees found the voxel art style apt for the game and its destruction-based gameplay. Jenkins wrote that it was "deceptively beautiful" and Biel regarded it "extremely visually attractive". Chris Jarrard reviewed Teardown for Shacknews and called the game "an absolute stunner", citing its use of ray tracing for lighting, shadows, and reflections, bounce lighting, ambient occlusion, and diffuse reflections. He further believed that the fire propagation exceeded that of his prior favourite, Far Cry 2.

Barbosa criticised the pace of upgrades in the campaign, feeling that it hindered the "ability to tear maps apart in entertaining ways" and prevented drastic changes in mission objectives. Menzel cited monotony in returning to the same maps with different objectives. In contrast, Jason Coles of NME found satisfaction in finding new shortcuts on previously played levels after unlocking the planks. Jarrard exclaimed that completing a mission with only seconds left was "a legitimate rush". Jenkins considered the campaign's narrative unnecessary, especially due to a lack of voiced dialogue and missing ability to meet the characters in the game. Jarrard said the story was "paper-thin".

Barbosa felt that the challenge modes had no lasting appeal, while Clayton bemoaned a lack of multiplayer and found the modding scene to be the game's "enduring lifeblood". Coles similarly believed that mods would be Teardowns legacy. Jenkins, Menzel, and Netti warned of possible motion sickness, and Cantees faulted an inconsistent performance. Schmädig found the game's gamepad support cumbersome.

Sales 
Teardown was among Steam's best-selling games in the first few days of its early access phase. In the same time frame, the game received more than 1,800 player reviews, of which 96% were positive, indicating an "overwhelmingly positive" reception. Gustafsson attributed the early success to the popularity of his Twitter videos. By August 2022, Teardown had sold 1.1 million copies.

Accolades 
Teardown received nominations for multiple year-end accolades, winning "Excellence in Design" at the 2021 Independent Games Festival. It was an honourable mention for "Best Technology" at the 2023 Game Developers Choice Awards. Shacknews named Teardown the best early access game of 2020 and, after its release, the best PC game of 2022. Rock Paper Shotguns editors cited the game as one of their favourite games of 2020, and it ranked #25 on PC Gamers list of the "top 100 PC games" in 2022. GameSpot cited it as one of 2022's best games, while Kotaku regarded it as one of the year's best games for the Steam Deck platform. PCGamesN said Teardown was one of the "best relaxing games in 2022", while PC Gamer named it the year's best sandbox.

Legacy 
On 1 July 2022, Tuxedo Labs was acquired by Saber Interactive as part of Embracer Group. Saber Interactive justified its purchase by arguing that Teardowns technology could be expanded into a larger platform and compete with Minecraft and Roblox. By the time the acquisition was announced in August 2022, Gustafsson had grown the studio's staff to six people, taking the title of chief technology officer and hiring as chief executive officer (CEO) Marcus Dawson, the former CEO of Illusion Labs.

Notes

References

External links 
 

2022 video games
Action video games
Early access video games
Independent Games Festival winners
Indie video games
Lua (programming language)-scripted video games
Open-world video games
Puzzle video games
Single-player video games
Video games developed in Sweden
Video games with Steam Workshop support
Windows games
Windows-only games